Stefan Fliegel (6 June 1908 – 31 October 1939) was a Polish footballer. He played in one match for the Poland national football team in 1935.

References

External links
 

1908 births
1939 deaths
Polish footballers
Poland international footballers
Place of birth missing
Association football midfielders
ŁKS Łódź players